Iran competed in the 2018 Asian Games in Jakarta and Palembang, Indonesia from 18 August to 2 September 2018. Iran has competed at the Asian Games since the first event in 1951 Delhi, and the best achievement was in 1974, when the country hosted the event in Tehran, by ranked second with the acquisition of 36 gold, 28 silver and 17 bronze medals. At the latest edition in Incheon, the country wrapped up its campaign with 57 medals in all - 21 gold, 18 silver and 18 bronze.

Iran participated at the Games with 378 athletes. The National Olympic Committee of the Islamic Republic of Iran (NOCIRI) named the 19-year-old Iranian and bronze medalist at the 2016 Rio Olympic Games, Kimia Alizadeh, who carried the Iranian flag at the inauguration of the competitions. But within 12 days to start of the tournament, she suffered a torn ACL injury during training. Elaheh Ahmadi was confirmed to replace her. Minister of Sports and Youth Affairs, Masoud Soltanifar, eyes fourth place at the Games.

Competitors 
The following is a list of the number of competitors representing Iran that will participate at the Games:

Medal summary

Medal table

Medalists

Results by event

Aquatics

Diving

Men

Swimming

Men

Water polo

Men

Archery

Men

Women

Mixed

Athletics

Men

Women

Badminton

Men

Women

Basketball

3x3
Men

Women

5x5
Men

Boxing

Men

Canoeing

Slalom
Men

Women

Sprint
Men

Women

Cycling

Mountain bike

Men

Women

Road
Men

Women

Track

Men

Equestrian

Fencing

Men

Women

Football

Summary

Men's tournament

Iran will join in group F at the men's football event.

Roster

Group F

Round of 16

Gymnastics

Artistic

Men

Handball
Men

Judo

Men

Women

Ju-jitsu

Men's ne-waza

Women's ne-waza

Kabaddi

Men

Women

Karate

Men's kumite

Women's kumite

Kurash

Men

Women

Paragliding

Men's accuracy

Pencak silat

Men's tanding

Women's tanding

Rowing

Men

Women

Sailing

Men

Open

Sambo

Men's sport

Women's sport

Sepak takraw

Men

Shooting

Men

Women

Mixed

Sport climbing

Men

Women

Squash

Men

Women

Table tennis

Men

Women

Taekwondo

Men's poomsae

Men's kyorugi

Women's poomsae

Women's kyorugi

Tennis

Men

Women

Triathlon

Men

Volleyball

Beach

Men

Indoor

Men

Weightlifting

Men

Wrestling

Men's freestyle

Men's Greco-Roman

Wushu

Men's sanda

Women's taolu

Women's sanda

Demonstration sports

Esports

Open

References

External links
Official website

Nations at the 2018 Asian Games
2018
Asian Games